Sergey Bukreyev (born 20 June 1976) is a Russian rower. He competed at the 2000 Summer Olympics and the 2004 Summer Olympics.

References

1976 births
Living people
Russian male rowers
Olympic rowers of Russia
Rowers at the 2000 Summer Olympics
Rowers at the 2004 Summer Olympics
Rowers from Moscow